Rubens Josué da Costa (24 November 1928 – 31 May 1991) was a Brazilian football player. He was included in the Brazil national football team at the 1954 FIFA World Cup finals.

Rubens played club football for Ypiranga-SP, Flamengo, Vasco da Gama, Portuguesa Desportos, Santa Cruz-PE, and Prudentina, winning the Campeonato Carioca in 1953, 1954 and 1955 with Flamengo and in 1958 with Vasco da Gama.

References

1928 births
1991 deaths
Brazilian footballers
Brazil international footballers
1954 FIFA World Cup players
Atlético Junior managers
Association football forwards
Brazilian football managers
Footballers from São Paulo